The Salisbury Infirmary was a hospital at Fisherton Street in Salisbury, Wiltshire, England, from 1767 until 1993.

History
The Salisbury Infirmary had a long history as a hospital. The first Lord Feversham, who died in 1763, left a sum of £500 towards the establishment of a county hospital and at a general meeting on 23 September 1766 a committee was established. The Earl of Pembroke was nominated as visitor, the Earl of Radnor as president, and Robert Cooper as treasurer, while Dr Henry Hele and Dr Jacob were appointed as physicians.

A site was purchased and the existing houses on it were opened for the reception of patients on 2 May 1767. Meanwhile, plans were drawn up by John Wood, the Younger of Bath for a new four-storey building on the site with over 100 beds.  When the new red-brick building was completed and opened in 1771, the existing houses were removed. The hospital was later much enlarged, with a wing added on one side in 1845 and the other side in 1869, and further 20th-century extensions. Alfred Buckley was the chairman of the infirmary for 13 years in the late 19th-century.

A new outpatients department, dedicated to T. E. Lawrence, the British military officer, was opened in 1936. The hospital joined the National Health Service in 1948. The building was recorded as Grade II listed in 1972, under the name General Infirmary.

It was in the intensive care unit at the Infirmary that the Thin Lizzy singer Phil Lynott died from an alcohol and drugs related illness in January 1986. After services transferred to the Salisbury District Hospital in 1991 the Infirmary closed in 1993. The building was converted for residential use in 1997.

Notable Staff 

 Adeline Elizabeth Cable ARRC (1864-1945), Matron from October 1907 until her retirement in August 1925. Cable trained at The London Hospital under Eva Luckes, and had served in the Second Anglo Boer War. During her tenure her nursing staff increased from 30- 60, she oversaw the opening of a new ophthalmic ward, balconies for all the wards, a new nurses home and outpatients department.

References

Georgian architecture in Wiltshire
Defunct hospitals in England
Hospital buildings completed in the 18th century
Hospitals in Wiltshire
1767 establishments in England
Grade II listed buildings in Wiltshire